Robert Dillington may refer to:

Sir Robert Dillington, 1st Baronet  (ca. 1575-1664)
Sir Robert Dillington, 2nd Baronet  (ca. 1634-1687), MP
Sir Robert Dillington, 3rd Baronet (ca. 1664-1689), MP for Newport (Isle of Wight) (UK Parliament constituency)
Robert Dillington (died 1604), MP for Yarmouth (Isle of Wight) (UK Parliament constituency) and Newtown, Isle of Wight